Prime Healthcare Services is a United States privately held healthcare company. It was established in 2001, by chairman and CEO Prem Reddy, MD, and operates 45 hospitals in 14 states. It is affiliated with the nonprofit Prime Healthcare Foundation.

Charity
Reddy and his family have established the Prem Reddy Family Foundation, which has supported several efforts, including one of country's newest schools of medicine at the California University of Science and Medicine, the Dr. Prem Reddy Nursing Laboratory at CSUSB, and the Dr. Prem Reddy Lecture Hall at Western University of Health Sciences.
In response to the surge of COVID-19 in India in spring of 2021, Prime Healthcare supplied ventilators, bipap machines, oxygen concentrators and associated equipment.

Controversy
In 2007, the Los Angeles Times ran a news story that alleged that the policies of Prime HealthCare Services, Inc., resulted in higher-than-average profits for the possible cost of patient care: "When Reddy's company, Prime Healthcare Services Inc., takes over a hospital, it typically cancels insurance contracts, allowing the hospital to collect steeply higher reimbursements. It has suspended services — such as chemotherapy treatments, mental health care and birthing centers — that patients need but aren't lucrative.... On four occasions since 2002, inspectors have found that Prime Healthcare facilities failed to meet minimum federal safety standards, placing their Medicare funding at risk."

In 2008 the State of California and Kaiser Permanente each sued Prime Healthcare over its balance billing practices and Kaiser obtained an injunction preventing Prime from continuing the practice; Prime had cancelled agreements with insurance companies when it acquired hospitals, leaving patients in an out-of-network situation resulting in higher costs, and has been aggressively pursuing patients including sending unpaid costs to collection agencies.  This was the first of several suits between Prime and Kaiser. In June 2010 Kaiser sued Prime Healthcare for "trapping patients" and contended that Prime Healthcare needlessly admitted emergency department patients, rather than transfer them to Kaiser facilities and then sending their insurance companies highly inflated bills.  Prime counter-sued Kaiser and the Service Employees International Union, claiming that Kaiser owed it $100 million in unpaid medical claims and that Kaiser and the union conspired to keep Prime out of the market; that suit was dismissed in 2012, and Prime appealed all the way to the US Supreme Court, which declined to hear the case in 2016.  In 2015 both sides agreed on dropping their respective lawsuits and resolve them through confidential and binding arbitration.

In 2010 Prime Healthcare came under investigation by the US Department of Health and Human Services and the California Department of Justice about concerns over a reported spike in sepsis. The investigation centers around whether the spike in sepsis represents a large public health issue or multimillion-dollar Medicare fraud. Six Prime hospitals ranked in the 99th percentile of U.S. hospitals for sepsis and five were in the 95th percentile. In 2011 Prime Healthcare Service had high rates of kwashiorkor among its elderly patients. At Shasta Regional Medical Center, Prime reported 16.1% of its Medicare patients suffered from kwashiorkor, but California's average for Medicare patients is 0.2%. In 2011 California Watch reported that Prime Healthcare had a practice of transferring high numbers of patients from its emergency department to its hospital beds, specifically with patients on Medicare. Some families describe being trapped by doctors at Prime facilities and were unable to see their own doctor at another facility. Former Prime employees have described an orchestrated campaign of admitting Medicare and Kaiser patients, moving them from the emergency department to a hospital bed, in the interest of changing the fortune of a money-losing hospital. In September 2011, California Attorney General Kamala Harris rejected the approval for the sale of the Victor Valley Global Medical Center in Victorville, California, and stated that the sale would not be in the public interest.

In 2012, two executives at Prime Healthcare Services disclosed a patient's chart to multiple media outlets without the patient's express written consent. The release was in response to a California Watch article on Prime Healthcare Services billing practices at Shasta Regional Medical Center, which included claims by a Darlene Courtois about her treatment by Shasta. In this incident, Randall Hempling, the hospital CEO, and Dr. Marcia McCampbell, its chief medical officer, showed up at the offices of the Redding Record Searchlight and successfully convinced the paper's editor not to publish an article, echoing the California Watch claims by reference to Courtois' actual medical records.

In May 2016 US Department of Justice joined a qui tam case against Prime Health Care and its chief executive concerning Medicare fraud.  The case was settled in August 2018 for $65 million, resolving the "allegations that 14 Prime hospitals in California knowingly submitted false claims to Medicare by admitting patients who required only less costly, outpatient care and by billing for more expensive patient diagnoses than the patients had (a practice known as "up-coding")." An additional case was settled in February 2019 for $1.25 million for similar allegations regarding two Prime hospitals in Pennsylvania.

In July 2021 US Department of Justice announce another settlement with Prime Health Care and its CEO Prem Reddy concerning kickbacks, overcharging for medical implants, and billing for a non-eligible provider by using another provider's billing identity. Dr. Reddy paid $1,775,000; and Prime paid $33,725,000.

Operations
Prime operates 45 acute care hospitals in 14 states. The hospital network has over 50,000 employees and physicians and more than 8,700 patient beds.

Prime Healthcare Foundation 
The Prime Healthcare Foundation is an affiliated 501(c)(3).

References

External links
 

 
2001 establishments in California
American companies established in 2001
Hospitals established in 2001
Companies based in San Bernardino County, California
Hospital networks in the United States
Privately held companies based in California